The 1998–99 Úrvalsdeild karla was the 47th season of the Úrvalsdeild, the top tier men's basketball league on Iceland. The season started on October 1, 1998 and ended on April 22, 1999. Keflavík won its fifth title by defeating Njarðvík 3–2 in the Finals.

Competition format
The participating teams first played a conventional round-robin schedule with every team playing each opponent once "home" and once "away" for a total of 22 games. The top eight teams qualified for the championship playoffs whilst the bottom team was relegated to Division 1.

Regular season

Playoffs

Notable occurrences
On 12 November, David Bevis was suspended for one game after tossing a water bottle at a wall after ÍA's a loss against Þór Akureyri which resulted in water hitting referees and staff at the scorers table.
On 23 November, it was reported that ÍA had released both David Bevis and Victor Pereira in a roster overhaul in what turned out to be an unpopular decision by head coach Alexander Ermolinskij.

References

External links
Official Icelandic Basketball Federation website

Icelandic
Lea
Úrvalsdeild karla (basketball)